Gints Meija (born September 4, 1987) is a Latvian professional ice hockey winger currently playing for Dinamo Riga of the Kontinental Hockey League (KHL). He previously played for EHC Black Wings Linz of the Austrian Hockey League (EBEL).

Career statistics

Regular season and playoffs

International

References

External links
 
 
 
 

1987 births
EHC Black Wings Linz players
Dinamo Riga players
HK Liepājas Metalurgs players
HK Riga 2000 players
Ice hockey players at the 2010 Winter Olympics
Ice hockey players at the 2022 Winter Olympics
Latvian ice hockey right wingers
Living people
Olympic ice hockey players of Latvia
Ice hockey people from Riga